Tetralimonius is a genus of click beetles in the family Elateridae, formerly included in the genus Limonius.

Species
 Tetralimonius definitus (Ziegler, 1845)
 Tetralimonius humeralis (Candèze, 1860)
 Tetralimonius maculicollis (Motschulsky, 1859)
 Tetralimonius nimbatus (Say, 1825)
 Tetralimonius ornatulus (LeConte, 1857)
 Tetralimonius quercus (Olivier, 1790)
 Tetralimonius reitteri (Gurjeva, 1976)

References

Dendrometrinae
Elateridae genera